McDowell is an unincorporated community in McDowell County, West Virginia, United States.

The community most likely was named after the local McDowell Coal and Coke Company.

References

Unincorporated communities in McDowell County, West Virginia
Unincorporated communities in West Virginia